Uchan-su (or Водопадная Vodopadnaya), is a river that flows in the South Coast of Crimea. The name translates from the Crimean Tatar language for  'swift water' .

The river runs into the Black Sea in the center city of Yalta.

The river water is used extensively for water supply and irrigation.

See also
 Waterfalls of Ukraine

Rivers of Crimea